This is a list of video games released for the Famicom video game console — released as the Nintendo Entertainment System outside Japan.

The Famicom would become the highest-selling video game console by the end of 1984, which paved the way for the North American release of the system in 1985.

In addition to the games, a software for programming titled Family BASIC was created by Nintendo, Hudson Soft and Sharp Corporation and released on June 21, 1984. An updated version of the software titled Family BASIC V3 was released on February 21, 1985.



List
This list is organized in alphabetical order by Japanese title. By clicking the arrow symbols in column headers it can also be organized alphabetically by English title (if applicable), alphabetically by publisher, or chronologically by release date.

There are  games on this list.

Unreleased games

Unlicensed games

See also

List of Nintendo Entertainment System games
List of Famicom Disk System games
Famicom

References

Nintendo-related lists
Video game lists by platform
Video games developed in Japan